The Pretoria Highlanders Regiment was a regiment of the South African Army. As a reserve unit, it had a status roughly equivalent to that of a British Army Reserve or United States Army National Guard unit.

Though the regiment was disbanded, the associated pipe band continues to operate.

History

World War 2
The regiment was founded by Peter Lawrence Goudie on the outbreak of World War II in 1939.  He recruited 1,400 men within six weeks and also raised the funds to equip them with Highland uniforms.

During World War II the regiment, as part of 7 South African Infantry Brigade, took part in "Operation Rose", the invasion of Madagascar by South African forces in June 1942. As far as is known, this is the first (and only) amphibious operation in which South African troops ever participated.

Post World War and into Border War

In 1946, the PH were converted to artillery and renamed 1 Anti-Tank Regiment (PH).  When the Army was reorganised in 1960, for internal security duties, the regiment was converted to armour and reverted to its original name of Pretoria Highlanders.

The regiment was assigned to the 7th Division's 73 Motorised Brigade.

Pipe Band
An early band was established around the time of the regiment's formation. The post-war Pretoria Highlanders Pipes and Drums was established in 1979. It was disbanded in 2005, by which time it received no official defence force support. The band was re-established and held its first gathering on 13 April 2013.

Officers Commanding
Cmdt Henk Kaal

Regimental Symbols
 Uniform
 Headdress: khaki Tam O'Shanter, black glengarry; Tourie (on both): bottle green.
 Tartan: Hunting Stewart (kilt); Sporran: brown leather as working dress and silver/grey haired for mess dress .
 Hose: khaki with tops of regimental tartan, green garter flashes.
 Nickname: "Jacaranda Jocks" (Pretoria is known as "the Jacaranda City")

Previous Dress Insignia

Battle honours
Madagascar 1942

External links 

 Pretoria Highlanders Pipes and Drums

References

Highland regiments
Artillery regiments of South Africa
Military units and formations established in 1939
Military units and formations disestablished in 2017